Cub Scouting is part of the Scouting program of the Boy Scouts of America (BSA), available to boys and girls from kindergarten through fifth grade, or 5 to 10 years of age and their families. Its membership is the largest of the five main BSA divisions (Cub Scouting, Scouts BSA, Venturing, Exploring and Sea Scouting). Cub Scouting is part of the worldwide Scouting movement and aims to promote character development, citizenship training, personal fitness, and leadership.

Origins

As early as 1911, Ernest Thompson Seton had developed a prototype program he named Cub Scouts of America that was never implemented. James E. West felt that having BSA divisions for younger boys (those under 12; the "younger boy problem") would draw away boys from the core program, which was Scout troops focused on the 12- to 17-year-old age group; thus he opposed such a program for some time. In spite of this, unofficial programs for younger boys started around this time, under names such as Junior Troops or Cadet Corps. The BSA obtained the rights to Lord Baden-Powell's The Wolf Cub's Handbook in 1916 and used it in unofficial Wolf Cub programs starting in 1918. This led to an issue with Daniel Carter Beard who felt that the use of the British book was nearly disloyal to the United States of America. West encouraged the formation of the Boy Rangers of America, a separate organization for boys eight through twelve based on an American Indian theme. The Boy Rangers used the Scout Law and their Chief Guide, Emerson Brooks, was a Boy Scout commissioner in Montclair, New Jersey. The BSA finally began some experimental Cub units in 1928 and in 1930 the BSA began registering the first Cub Scout packs, and the Boy Rangers were absorbed.

The British Cubbing program used elements of Rudyard Kipling's Jungle Book series, with the Cubmaster taking the role of Akela and the assistant Cubmaster the role of Baloo. The American program also syncretized American Indian elements, with all Cub Scouts belonging to the Webelos tribe, symbolized by the Arrow of Light and led by Akela. Webelos was also a portmanteau meaning Wolf, Bear, Lion, Scout; the name was later given a backronym of "WE'll BE LOyal Scouts". The initial rank structure was Wolf, Bear and Lion, with ages of 9, 10 and 11. Dens of six to eight Cubs were entirely led by a Scout holding the position of den chief.

Aims, methods, and purposes
The Aims of Cub Scouting are the same as the other divisions—character, citizenship, personal fitness, and leadership.

The Methods of Cub Scouting
 Living the Ideals
 Belonging to a Den
 Advancement
 Family Involvement
 Activities
 Serving the Neighborhood
 Blue Uniform
 Working for badges

The Purposes of Cub Scouting are
 Character Development
 Spiritual Growth
 Good Citizenship
 Sportsmanship and Fitness
 Family Understanding
 Respectful Relationships
 Personal Achievement
 Friendly Service
 Fun and Adventure
 Preparation for Scouts

Ideals
On June 1, 2015, the Cub Scout Promise and the Law of the Pack were retired and replaced by the Scout Oath and Scout Law. The Cub Scout Motto continues to be used.

The Cub Scout sign, two raised fingers of the right hand, identifies the youth as a Cub Scout and the two fingers stand for the Scout Oath and Law. The Cub Scout salute, two fingers of the right hand raised to the edge of the cap or eyebrow, is used to show respect for the country when saluting the flag of the United States. The Cub Scout handshake, first two fingers along the inside of the other Scout's wrist, is used to help each other remember and obey the Scout Oath and Law.

Organization

The Cub Scout pack is sponsored by a community organization such as a business, service organization, school, labor group or religious institution. The chartered organization is responsible for selecting leadership, providing a meeting place and promoting a good program. The chartered organization representative is the liaison between the pack, the chartered organization, and the BSA.

The pack meets once a month, providing a program for Cub Scouts, leaders, parents and other family members attending. The pack is led by a Cubmaster with one or more assistant Cubmasters. The pack committee is a group of adults, led by the pack committee chair, who plan the pack program and activities and manage record keeping, finance, leadership recruitment and registration. The pack trainer is responsible for ensuring that all of the pack leaders are trained and for maintaining training records.

Cub Scouts who join a pack are assigned to dens with ideally six to eight members, usually based on age: Lion Scouts (kindergarten), Tiger Scouts (first grade), Wolf Scouts (second grade), Bear Scouts (third grade), and Webelos Scouts (fourth and fifth grades). Dens meet weekly or biweekly under the direction of the adult den leader. A Cub Scout is elected to the Denner position to provide basic leadership to the den. A Scout or Venturer holding the den chief position may assist the den leader in activities. Den meetings are planned around a particular adventure being worked on for rank advancement and may include games, handicrafts, hikes and other outdoor fun while also preparing for the next pack meeting.

Webelos is an acronym meaning "We'll Be Loyal Scouts". According to the Bear Cub Scout Book of 1954, the name originally came from the initial letters of "wolf, bear, lion, Scout", the rank of "Lion Cub Scout" was dropped in 1967, however was used again in 2017 with the launch of the pilot kindergarten program of the same name which became a full-fledged part of the program in 2018. Packs with a large number of Webelos Scouts sometimes divide them into Webelos I and Webelos II dens, to keep their den from previous years intact. Starting in 2017, fifth graders work on the formalized rank of Arrow of Light, so this I and II distinction may no longer be necessary. Webelos dens spend much of their time learning about Scout customs, including the Scout Law and Oath. Many packs are formally associated with a Scout troop for mutual support—the troop provides assistance to the pack with activities such as campouts and ceremonies and in time, the Webelos Scouts cross over to the troop.

The Lone Cub Scout program serves youth who cannot take part in a nearby Cub Scout pack on a regular basis because of such factors as distance, weather, time, disability or similar issues.

In October 2017, The Boy Scouts of America announced that girls would be welcomed into the Cub Scout program in single gender dens but co-ed packs. 77,000 girls joined nationwide creating packs in California, among other places.

Uniform
The uniform gives a Cub Scout visibility and creates a level of identity within both the unit and the community. The neckerchief, the neckerchief slide and the belt buckle uniforms are similar in basic design, they do vary in color and detail to identify the different divisions of Cub Scouts, Scouts and Venturers. In all cases, shirts are tucked in.

Youth uniforms
Lions wear a unique uniform consisting of a blue t-shirt with lion logo on front, blue web belt, blue cap with lion logo, and optional yellow neckerchief and slide.

Tigers wear the Cub Scout uniform; it is accompanied by orange topped socks, orange neckerchief, neckerchief slide with the Tiger logo, the cap with an orange panel and Tiger emblem and the blue belt with Tiger emblem on the buckle.

Wolves wear the Cub Scout uniform and the Wolf cap with yellow or red panel and Wolf logo and the yellow or red neckerchief and the neckerchief slide with Wolf logo.

Bears wear the Cub Scout uniform and a cap with light blue panel with Bear logo. The light blue neckerchief and the neckerchief slide have the Bear logo.

Webelos Scouts wear the Scouts BSA field uniform with blue shoulder loops. The Webelos cap is green with a plaid panel and the oval Webelos emblem; the plaid is made up of the Cub Scouting blue and gold and the Scouts BSA red and green. The neckerchief is plaid with the Webelos logo and is worn with the slide with Webelos emblem. Webelos wearing the Scout uniform may choose to use the Webelos belt buckle with either the blue Cub Scout or the green Scout belt; Cub Scout belt loop recognitions, however, fit only the blue belt. The Webelos den may elect to wear a den emblem in place of the den number; the patches are the same as the Scout patrol patches.

Scouter uniforms
Adult leaders wear the basic Scout field uniform. Female leaders of dens below Webelos level have the option of the classic female Cub Scouter uniform with blue web belt. Leaders that wear the tan uniform shirt wear blue shoulder loops on the epaulets, Centennial or Switchbacks pants or shorts, and the Scout web or leather belt. They may wear the Cub Scout Leader neckerchief or any official BSA neckerchief, with the appropriate neckerchief slide or woggle. Leaders may wear any official BSA adult hat.

The Scouter dress uniform is appropriate for professional Scouters and all Scouting leaders on formal occasions.

Advancement and recognition

Advancement is one of the methods used to promote the aims of character development, citizenship training, personal fitness, and leadership. Everything a Cub Scout does in the advancement program is intended to achieve these aims and aid in personal growth. On June 1, 2015, Cub Scouting changed the advancement system to an "adventure" system, including required and elective adventures for all ranks. Lion, Tiger, Wolf, and Bear Cubs earn activity belt loops for each completed adventure, while Webelos earn activity pins which can be worn on the cap or on the Webelos colors.

Lion badge
Kindergartners work toward the Lion badge. The Lion badge is earned by completing five adventures. Outside of the requirements, Lion Scouts can also complete any number of seven elective adventures of their den's or family's choosing. Lions do not earn the Bobcat badge. This badge is meant to introduce possible scouts to the pack. The Lion badge is the most recent addition to Cub Scouts as it was introduced in 2018.

Bobcat badge
All youth beginning in first grade will first work on their Bobcat badge to complete the Cub Scout joining requirements, which include knowing and reciting the Scout Oath and Scout Law and knowing the Cub Scout motto and salute. Once the Bobcat badge requirements have been completed, the Cub Scout will continue with the age appropriate program.

Tiger, Wolf, and Bear badges
Cub Scouts in first grade work toward the Tiger badge, while those in second grade work toward the Wolf badge, and those in third grade work toward the Bear badge. Cub Scouts at all three levels must complete six required adventures and one of thirteen elective adventures with their den or family, as well as completing age-specific cyber-safety exercises (called the Cyber Chip) and exercises to help prevent child abuse with their family. The Cyber Chip and abuse prevention requirements must be completed annually, although the Cyber Chip may be waived if the family does not have internet access at home or otherwise readily available. The remaining elective adventures may be completed throughout the rest of the school year.

Webelos Scouts
Cub Scouts in fourth and fifth grades work toward the Webelos. The word originally was an acronym for the previous, now discontinued hierarchy Wolf/Bear/Lion/Scout with vowels added, and is now said to be short for "WE'll BE LOyal Scouts." Initially, Webelos work toward the Webelos badge and Arrow of Light. A Cub Scout may begin work toward the Arrow of Light only after earning the Webelos badge; however, a new Cub Scout first joining a pack while in fifth grade may immediately begin working toward the Arrow of Light.

Webelos Scout badge
To earn the Webelos Scout badge, the Cub Scout must complete five required adventures, two of eighteen elective adventures, and the Cyber Chip and child abuse prevention exercises. As with previous years, the Cyber Chip can be waived if the family does not have easy access to the internet. Webelos Scouts wearing the blue Cub Scout uniform wear a Webelos badge of the same size and shape as the previous ranks, and can be placed on the uniform where the Tiger Cub badge goes; Webelos Scouts wearing the tan Scout shirt wear an oval-shaped Webelos badge, which is the same size as the Scout rank badges.

Arrow of Light
The Arrow of Light award is the highest rank award available to Cub Scouts. To earn the Arrow of Light, the Cub Scout must complete four required adventures, three of eighteen elective adventures, and the Cyber Chip and child abuse prevention exercises. The Cyber Chip exercises can be waived if the family does not have easy access to the internet. Earning the Arrow of Light allows a youth to join a Scout troop at ten years of age instead of eleven.  The requirements for the Arrow of Light overlap significantly with the requirements for the first rank in Scouts BSA, the Scout rank.  Recipients of the Arrow of Light thus have an advantage in earning the Scout rank soon after joining a Scout troop. The Arrow of Light award is one of the few Cub Scout awards that can be worn on a Scout uniform. Both Cub Scouts and Scouts wear the Arrow of Light badge below the left pocket. Adults wear the square-knot version of the badge above the left pocket.

Religious emblems

Several religious emblems programs are administered by various religious institutions and recognized, but not sponsored, by the BSA. These are generally recognized by a medal and an embroidered square knot that can also be worn on the Scouting uniform.

Leader recognition
Cub Scout leaders who complete training, tenure, and performance requirements are recognized by a system of awards. The Den Leader Award, the Scouter's Training Award, and the Cubmaster's Training Key are available.  These awards were standardized to more closely align with the BSA's other programs in 2012, removing most of the distinctive Cub Scout level awards such as Tiger Cub Den Leader's Training Award (discontinued December 2012), the Webelos Den Leader's Training Award (discontinued December 2012), the Cubmaster's Training Award (discontinued December 2013), the Cub Scouter's Training Award (discontinued December 2013), and the Pack Trainer Award (discontinued December 2013).  The Scouter's Training Award replaced the Cub Scouter Award, and the Cubmaster's Training Key replaced the Cubmaster's Training Award. The Pack Trainer Award had previously replaced the Den Leader Coach Award, which was officially discontinued on December 31, 2008.  Any awards earned prior to the date of their retirement can still be worn. These awards are recognized by a certificate, medal, and an embroidered square knot insignia. Den Chiefs may earn the Den Chief Service Award.

Program and activities
Each pack has a number of annual events such as the pinewood derby, raingutter regatta, the space derby, gold rush, the blue and gold banquet and Scout Sunday or Scout Sabbath.

Several structured camping activities are available in the Cub Scout program. The pack overnighter is a pack-organized camping activity that provides Cub Scouts with positive outdoor experiences. Cub Scout day camp or twilight camp is an accredited, organized, one- to five-day program for Cub Scouts using trained leadership at an approved site, and is usually held during daylight or early evening hours, but not overnight. Cub Scout resident camp is an organized, accredited overnight camping program covering at least two nights and conducted under trained leadership in an established Scout camp operated by the council. The Webelos den overnight camp introduces the Scout and parents to the camping program, under the leadership of the Webelos den leader. Joint campouts with a local Scout troop for second-year Webelos can help to strengthen ties between the pack and troop and facilitate the transition from Webelos to Scouts.

The Soccer and Scouting program is designed to involve Hispanic youth and families in the Cub Scout program, instructing Scouts in both soccer and Cub Scout values.

Alcohol is prohibited at all Cub Scout events. A number of "high-risk" outdoor activities are banned by BSA (including Cubs), and others are limited to special programs. Paintball, lasertag, hunting, rodeo, fireworks, and bungee-jumping are among prohibited activities.

Training
Fast Start Training is the introduction for adult leaders new to the Cub Scout program. Fast Start is self-paced and provided as a video or online. Youth Protection Training is required for all adult leaders and must be recertified per local council policy. Basic Leader Training consists of the online This is Scouting course and Leader Specific Training. This is Scouting is a common core program for all adult leaders in the Cub Scouting, Scouts BSA, Varsity Scouting, and Venturing divisions. Leader Specific Training is provided for the Tiger Cub den leader, Cub Scout den leader, Webelos den leader, Cubmaster, pack committee chairman and assistants. Once Basic Leader Training is completed, the leader is awarded a Trained emblem for uniform wear.

At least one adult on a pack overnight campout must attend the Basic Adult Leader Outdoor Orientation (BALOO) in order to properly understand camping requirements. Leaders for day camp and resident camp programs must be trained and certified by the National Camping School.

Supplemental training modules are designed to provide orientation beyond Basic Leader Training. These shorter training sessions are often provided at the Roundtable, a monthly meeting of leaders from the district, at a Pow-Wow or University of Scouting program offered by the local council and at National Cub Scouting Conferences held at the Philmont Scout Ranch and the Florida National High Adventure Sea Base.

Wood Badge is the advanced training program for leadership skills for all adults in all BSA programs. Wood Badge consists of six days of training (usually presented as two three-day weekends) and an application phase of several months. When training is complete, leaders are recognized with the Wood Badge beads, neckerchief and woggle.

Training is also provided for all new den chiefs.

Notes

AThe Webelos badge and Arrow of Light use the same pool of eighteen elective adventures. A Cub Scout may not use the elective adventures completed for the Webelos badge toward the Arrow of Light badge.
BWhile any religious emblem may be earned as a Cub Scout and worn as a Scout, these are administered and awarded by religious institutions and are not considered BSA awards as such.
CNeck medallions were previously also awarded, but discontinued in 2001.

References

External links

 
 
 
 
 
 
 

 1
1930 establishments in the United States